Trinity Theatre is a theatre and arts centre, located in the former Holy Trinity Church in the centre of Royal Tunbridge Wells, Kent.

Holy Trinity Church: 1829–1972
As a developing spa town, Tunbridge Wells was short of church capacity, and had no parish church. In 1818, the Church Commissioners created a fund to provide new churches in growing towns, for which it was decided by the residents and visitors to the town to apply for. Led by Lord Abergavenny, a subscription fund was started, which raised the £10,591 construction costs. Architect Decimus Burton (1800–1881), who had already been commissioned to design villas in Calverley Park, agreed to design the building, to a then popular Gothic Revival architecture style. Built in locally quarried sandstone from Calverley Quarry, the first stone was laid on 17 August 1827. Constructed by Mr Barrett of Tunbridge Wells, the finished church, which cost just over £12,000 to complete including fitting out, was consecrated in September 1829.

Due to the popularity of Tunbridge Wells in the Victorian age, a number of churches were built in the town. Hence following the fall in congregation numbers after World War II, the town had a number of churches which were in great need of major maintenance. As the largest church in the town, it was decided to decommission it. The church held its last religious service in 1972.

Derelict: 1973-1981
In 1974 the Church Commissioners declared Holy Trinity "redundant to pastoral needs," thereby allowing for its potential demolition, and redevelopment of the site as housing or offices. However, after a petition was raised by the Royal Tunbridge Wells Civic Society, the commissioners gave the society one year to find a suitable public use for the building. After approving in principle a plan to turn the building into a community theatre and arts centre in 1976, £50,000 was raised in six months, to allow a long term lease to be agreed from January 1977 with the Diocese of Rochester.

Trinity Theatre: 1982-present
Supported by Tunbridge Wells Borough Council (£15,000), Kent County Council and Arts Council England, over a five-year period the internal redevelopment addressed dry rot and damaged stonework, to turn the building into a theatre with 350 raked seats.

Subsequent grants have allowed developments to include a cafeteria, public bar, and redevelopment of the side vestibules to allow for art shows and local arts classes. In March 1996 an application was approved by the National Lottery for £600,000 of additional internal improvements, which provided a computerised box office, new seats, and an access ramp for wheelchair users.

In its now 25-year history, Trinity Theatre has collaborated with performers and groups from Steven Berkoff to the Royal National Theatre, as well as hosting international performing arts, film and visual arts. With over 90,000 people now coming through its doors annually, Trinity is acknowledged as one of the leading arts and performance venues in the South East of England.

Tunbridge Wells Theatre Club
Originally launched in 1946 as the Tunbridge Wells Drama Club, after the church became available in 1977, the club and its committee became central to the buildings revival. After the restoration of the building in 1982, it renamed itself as Trinity Theatre Club. Today it is one of the most active amateur theatre clubs in the southeast, putting on four productions per annum.

See also
List of places of worship in Tunbridge Wells (borough)

References

External links

Trinity Theatre
Trinity Theatre at Tunbridge Wells Borough Council
Trinity Theatre Club

Trinity Theatre
Grade II* listed buildings in Kent
Gothic Revival architecture in Kent
Theatres in Kent
Arts centres in England
Grade II* listed churches in Kent
Grade II* listed theatres
Decimus Burton buildings
Churches completed in 1829
19th-century churches in the United Kingdom